Chiswick railway station is a railway station within the Grove Park residential area of Chiswick in the London Borough of Hounslow. The station is on the Hounslow Loop Line, and all trains serving it are operated by South Western Railway. Journey time into London Waterloo is approximately 25 minutes and Clapham Junction 15 minutes. The station is in Travelcard Zone 3.

Chiswick station is the nearest station to Chiswick House and gardens. It is 20 minutes' walk, and separated by A4 arterial road subways, from the commercial part of town, Chiswick High Road, which is served by Gunnersbury (District line and London Overground), Turnham Green and Stamford Brook stations.

Services 
The typical weekday service from the station is six trains per hour to London Waterloo – four direct via Putney and Clapham Junction, and two via Brentford and Richmond – as well as two trains per hour to Weybridge.

On Sundays the service is two trains per hour, with hourly services between Waterloo and Woking via Hounslow and hourly services between Waterloo and Twickenham, Kingston and Wimbledon via Hounslow.

Connections
London Buses route E3 serves the station.

References

External links 

Railway stations in the London Borough of Hounslow
Former London and South Western Railway stations
Railway stations in Great Britain opened in 1849
Railway stations served by South Western Railway
William Tite railway stations
1849 establishments in England
Railway station